Harry A. Davis (born January 27, 1957) is a retired American basketball player who played for two seasons in the National Basketball Association (NBA) for the Cleveland Cavaliers and San Antonio Spurs.

Davis, a 6'7 forward from Cathedral Latin High School in Cleveland, Davis played for coach Hugh Durham at Florida State University from 1974 to 1978.  Davis scored 1,514 points in his career, averaging 14.0 points and 6.8 rebounds per game.  His best year was 1977–78, where he averaged 19.5 points and 7.4 rebounds per game and was named Metro Conference co-player of the year with Louisville's Rick Wilson.  He led the Seminoles to the 1978 NCAA tournament.

Following his collegiate career, Davis was drafted by his hometown Cleveland Cavaliers in the 1978 NBA draft (second round, pick #33).  He played one season with the Cavaliers, averaging 4.1 points and 1.7 rebounds per game in 40 games.  He was waived the following season, but signed a 10-day contract with the San Antonio Spurs.  He averaged 3.3 points and 1.4 rebounds per game in his last 4 games in the NBA.

Davis played in the Continental Basketball Association until 1985, most notably for the Atlantic City Hi-Rollers, where he finished among the league's top scorers in 1981 and 1982.  Davis also played in Europe.

Davis was inducted into the Florida State University athletic Hall of Fame in 1998.

References

1956 births
Living people
African-American basketball players
American expatriate basketball people in Belgium
American expatriate basketball people in Italy
American expatriate basketball people in Spain
American men's basketball players
Atlantic City Hi-Rollers players
Basketball players from Cleveland
CB Zaragoza players
Cleveland Cavaliers draft picks
Cleveland Cavaliers players
Detroit Spirits players
Florida State Seminoles men's basketball players
Lancaster Lightning players
Liga ACB players
Maine Lumberjacks players
Power forwards (basketball)
San Antonio Spurs players
21st-century African-American people
20th-century African-American sportspeople